Porin maalaiskunta (abbr. Porin mlk, "the Rural Municipality of Pori") is a former municipality in the province of Satakunta, Finland. It was annexed with the city of Pori in 1967. Population of Porin maalaiskunta was 8,709 in 1963.

Porin maalaiskunta covered areas like Yyteri and the Port of Pori, which are parts of the present Meri-Pori district.

Notable people 
Eino Grön
Kelpo Gröndahl
Johan Gullichsen
Maire Gullichsen
Aarne Tarkas
Miikka Toivola

See also 
Maalaiskunta

References

External links 

Former municipalities of Finland
Populated places disestablished in 1967
Pori
1967 disestablishments in Finland